Edmund Sloane "Tad" Coffin (born May 9, 1955, in Toledo, Ohio) is an American saddlemaker and equestrian. Coffin won two gold medals in the 1976 Summer Olympics in Montreal riding Bally Cor. He grew up on Long Island, then moved with his family to Strafford, Vermont, but now lives in Charlottesville, Virginia. He is the nephew of clergyman and peace activist William Sloane Coffin.

References

External links 
 Tad Coffin Saddles official site
 - Vermont Sports Hall of Fame Bio

1955 births
American event riders
American male equestrians
Equestrians at the 1976 Summer Olympics
Olympic gold medalists for the United States in equestrian
Sportspeople from Toledo, Ohio
Sportspeople from Vermont
Living people
Medalists at the 1976 Summer Olympics
Equestrians at the 1975 Pan American Games
Pan American Games medalists in equestrian
Pan American Games gold medalists for the United States
Medalists at the 1975 Pan American Games